Beddington is a suburban settlement in the London Borough of Sutton on the boundary with the London Borough of Croydon.  Beddington is formed from a village of the same name which until early the 20th century still included land which became termed entirely as Wallington. The latter was in the 13th century shown on local maps as Hakebrug, and named after a bridge on the River Wandle. The locality has a landscaped wooded park at Beddington Park – also known as Carew Manor; and a nature reserve and sewage treatment works in the centre and to the north of its area respectively. The population of Beddington according to the 2011 census is 21,044.

Beddington forms part of the Carshalton and Wallington constituency, which is represented in Westminster by Conservative Elliot Colburn. Of the six councillors that Beddington elects to Sutton Council (from the wards Beddington North and Beddington South), three are Liberal Democrats and three are Independents.

History

The village lay in Wallington hundred and until the 19th century was in secular and ecclesiastical terms a large parish in its own right. Wallington was for centuries a manor in Beddington parish and although known as a shorthand for the area stretching from Cheam to Addington and from Chaldon to Mitcham (inclusive). Wallington superseded Beddington's former area almost completely in the early 20th century.

The settlement appears in the Domesday Book as Beddinton(e) held partly by Robert de Watevile from Richard de Tonebrige and by Miles Crispin. Its Domesday Assets were: 6 hides; 1 church, 14 ploughs, 4 mills worth £3 15s 0d,  of meadow, woodland worth 10 hogs per year. It rendered: £19 10s 0d per year to its feudal system overlords. As this was before the expansion of Wallington, it extends on the south over the chalk downs at Roundshaw and northwards on to the London Clay. Lavender and medicinal herbs were grown commercially in the parish. The population in 1901 was 4,812. The parish was bounded on the north by Mitcham Common, and the three parishes of Croydon, Beddington and Mitcham met on the railway line by Beddington Lane station.

The 1911 Victoria County History documents Beddington in the period of its shrinkage.

A parish hall was built at Wallington in 1888, following its church and parish being set up in 1867 (in Beddington at the time). Holy Trinity Church school was built in 1896; the High School for girls was built in 1895 and enlarged in 1905.  Thus it came about that Wallington took up most of the land of Beddington.

A static inverter plant of HVDC Kingsnorth stood here in the late 20th century.

Beddington Mill

The Domesday Book mentions two Mills at Beddington, and the current one is thought to have been the site of one of these. Once erroneously thought to have been owned in the late 16th century by Sir Walter Raleigh, an early 17th-century lease shows that it was in fact owned by the Carew family as a flour mill.  In 1805 it was a snuff mill with a new owner, and it changed hands several times before being burnt down and replaced by the current building in 1891-2 by Wallis & Co as a flour mill and bakery.

The old – 18th-century or earlier – mill house remains to this day.

Beddington Park

Carew Manor
Beddington Park was the former manor house of the Carew family, lost to money lenders (see George Samuel Ford) and bad debts by Charles Hallowell Hallowell Carew in the 1850s.  The Domesday Book mentions two Beddington estates and these were united by Nicholas Carew to form Carew Manor in 1381. The Manor, once a medieval moated house, was home to the Royal Female Orphanage from 1866 until 1968. It now contains council offices and Carew Manor School.

In about 1591 Sir Walter Raleigh secretly, and without royal permission, married one of Queen Elizabeth I's maids of honour, Elizabeth Throckmorton of Carew Manor. Raleigh spent time in the Tower of London for this and Elizabeth was expelled from the court but the marriage appears to have been a genuine love-match and survived the imprisonment. A popular story is that when Raleigh was beheaded by James I in 1618, Elizabeth claimed his embalmed head and kept it in a bag for the rest of her life. His body was buried in St Margaret's, Westminster, and after his wife's death 29 years later, Raleigh's head was returned to his tomb and interred at St. Margaret's Church. Local myths claim the head remains in Beddington park or was inherited by his son and buried with him.

The Grade I listed great hall (or banqueting hall), containing a fine hammerbeam roof, survives from the mediaeval house. In the grounds are part of the orangery built in the early 18th century around orange trees planted by Sir Francis Carew (claimed to be the first planted in England) and an early 18th-century Grade II* listed dovecote.

Archaeologists have discovered a Tudor garden including a grotto at Carew Manor, believed to have been created by Sir Francis Carew in the 16th century. Its exact location has not been disclosed in order to protect it from looting.

As well as Carew Manor, the family have given their name to a street in nearby Wallington, Carew Road.

Carew Arms
Arms of Carew: Or, 3 lions passant in pale sable  were the arms shown on the seal of "Nicholas de Carreu" (c. 1255 – 1311), appended to the Barons' Letter, 1301, which he joined as "Lord of Mulesford" and which were blazoned for the same bearer in the Caerlaverock Poem or Roll of Arms of 1300, when he was present at the Siege of Caerlaverock Castle. From him are descended the Carew baronets of Antony and of Haccombe, the Earl of Totnes and Baron Carew.

St Mary's Church

The Grade II* listed 14th-century flint parish church of St Mary's occupies a prominent position in Beddington Park, immediately south of what is now Carew Manor School.  It contains an organ screen by William Morris. The church is designated at Grade II* for the following principal reasons:
It has substantial amounts of fabric from the 14th and 15th centuries
It was extensively restored and provided with an extremely elaborate and interesting mid-Victorian decorative scheme.
It has monuments and other fixtures of importance from circa 1200 to the 20th century, including font and Carew tombs.
The Morris and Co. organ is of special note, and the Last Judgment reredos is unusual.

Transport 
Beddington is served by the Wimbledon branch of the Tramlink network.

The area is served by a number of bus routes, all of which are operated by Transport for London.
407 – Sutton to Caterham
410 – Wallington to Crystal Palace
455 – Wallington to Purley, Old Lodge Lane
463 – Pollards Hill to Coulsdon South

Namesakes 
Beddington Heights, Calgary is named after Beddington, Surrey.

Nearest places 

 Carshalton
 Hackbridge
 Mitcham
 Roundshaw
 Waddon
 Wallington

References

Areas of London
Districts of the London Borough of Sutton